Deviance may refer to:

 Deviance (sociology), actions or behaviors that violate social norms
 Deviancy amplification spiral, a cognitive bias (error in judgement): a deviancy amplification term used by interactionist sociologist to refer to the way levels of deviance or crime can be increased by the societal reaction to deviance itself.
 Deviance (statistics), a quality of fit statistic for a model
 Positive deviance 
 Paraphilia, historically referred to as sexual deviance
 Bid‘ah, Islamic term for innovations and deviations acts or groups from orthodox Islamic law (Sharia)

See also 

 Deviant (disambiguation)
 Deviation (disambiguation)
 Discrepancy (disambiguation)
 Divergence (disambiguation)